Elections to Lancashire County Council were held in May 1989.

Results

By ward

Peter Billington resigned, and a by election was held on 13 June 1991.

Peter Britcliffe resigned on 1 February 1993, within three months of the 1993 County Elections. Therefore, no by election was held.

References

Lancashire
1989
1980s in Lancashire
May 1989 events in the United Kingdom